Adacel  is a global technology company that develops and implements air traffic management systems, air traffic control simulation and training solutions. The company was established in 1987. Its major customers include Federal Aviation Administration, United States Air Force, United States Department of Defense, civil air navigation service providers such as HungaroControl, AustroControl,  Air Services Australia, NAV Portugal, Fiji Airports, DSNA France, as well as military organizations around the world.

The company's Air Traffic Management (ATM) and International Simulation & Training business is located in Montreal, Quebec. US Simulation & Training, along with customer support is located in Orlando, Florida. The company also maintains an office in Melbourne, Australia.

The two main systems Adacel markets are: The Aurora Air Traffic Management System and MaxSim Air Traffic Management Simulation and Training. Other products the company makes include AeroDrive - Airport Driving Simulator, Lexix speech recognition technology, ICE - Intelligent Communications Environment and others.

The Aurora Air Traffic Management System is used to manage over 21% of the world's airspace, including airspace controlled by Iceland, Norway, France, Portugal, Fiji, New Zealand and the United States. Aurora supports oceanic, en route, approach, and tower control. It also features advanced flight and surveillance data processing, advanced conflict prediction, clearance processing and coordination capabilities, as well as electronic flight strips. MaxSim Air Traffic Control Simulation and Training can be scaled from a 360-degree display to a mobile solution.

References

 Company Profile
 Press Releases
 Industry Capabilities: Adacel Technologies Limited
 Aurora Air Traffic Management
 MaxSim Air Traffic Control Simulation and Training
 Support Services
 Investor Information

External links
 Air-traffic tech company Adacel boosts profit guidance amid travel slump

Software companies of Australia
Manufacturing companies based in Melbourne
Companies established in 1987
Companies listed on the Australian Securities Exchange